Olympism refers to the philosophy of the Olympic games. The fundamental principles of Olympism are outlined in the Olympic Charter.

Olympism is a philosophy that seeks to blend sport with culture, education, and international cooperation. It emphasizes the joy of effort, the educational value of good examples, social responsibility, and respect for universal ethical principles. The ultimate goal is to use sport as a means of promoting the development of humankind and preserving human dignity.

It is believed by some that the principles of Olympism include the idea that the ability to participate in sports is a basic human right. The belief is that individuals should have equal access to sports without discrimination and that these activities should be done in a spirit of fairness and camaraderie.

The principle of non-discrimination is a fundamental aspect of Olympism. It holds that individuals should be able to participate in sports without facing discrimination based on factors such as race, gender, sexual orientation, religion, and socioeconomic status.

Individuals who follow or support Olympism may refer to their actions as "fostering personal development."

Some individuals have expressed skepticism towards Olympism, stating that it is an ideal that may not be fully achievable. They also point out instances where the games have not met their stated goals..

Olympism in action 
Six activities are currently included within Olympism in Action. Activities include Development through Sport, Education through Sport, Peace through Sport, Sport and the Environment, Sport for All, and Women and Sport. These activities are endorsed by the Olympic Movement.

The International Olympic Committee (IOC) supports Development through Sport by working with the United Nations (UN) and other governmental agencies to help people perceive, gain, and understand the world around them through athletics. For Education through Sport, the IOC created the Olympic Values Education Programme (OVEP) to teach its participants about the advantages of being physically active and playing sports. IOC President Thomas Bach has shown his support for Peace through Sport by stating "The Olympic athletes show the whole world that it is possible to compete with each other while living peacefully together. In this world of uncertainty that we are living in today, the Olympic Games are even more relevant than ever.”

To support its idea for Sport and the Environment, the IOC is a principal support partner for the Sustainable Sport and Events (SSE) Toolkit created by the International Academy of Sports Science and Technology (AISTS). The toolkit focuses on how National Olympic Committees should go about choosing a city or cities to host, as well as construction for the venue, transportation, and accommodation for athletes and visitors. The IOC works towards Sport for All to offer access to sports to everyone, no matter their gender, race, or social class. Women in Sport is the IOC’s way to continue to support and improve gender equality. They do this by creating “leadership development, advocacy and awareness campaigns” and putting more women in leadership roles in the Committee.

However, the principle of non-discrimination is not always followed by IOC: during 2021–2022 Russo-Ukrainian crisis IOC EB recommends no participation of Russian and Belarusian athletes and officials, urges International Sports Federations and organizers of sports events worldwide to do everything in their power to ensure that no athlete or sports official from Russia or Belarus be allowed to take part under the name of Russia or Belarus.

References 

Olympic culture